Billy Mays (1958–2009) was an American salesperson and pitchman for various infomercials.

Billy Mays or William Mays may also refer to:

Billy Mays (footballer) (1902–1959), Welsh footballer
Bill Mays (born 1944), American jazz pianist
Willie Mays (born 1931), American baseball player

See also
William Mayes (disambiguation)
William May (disambiguation)